The Laureano Gómez bridge, popularly known as Pumarejo bridge after its promoter Alberto Pumarejo, is a bridge in Colombia, built over the Magdalena River to connect the Salamanca Island Road Park and the city of Barranquilla. The bridge was designed by Riccardo Morandi and built by an Italian-Colombian group between 1970 and 1974.

This Pumarejo Bridge, which has generated controversy since its design stage because of its poor technical characteristics, especially its limited gauge which prevented the development of river navigation on the Magdalena River, was replaced on 20 December 2019 by the new Alberto Pumarejo bridge. The old bridge will possibly be demolished, at least the central part, which prevents river navigation.

References

External links 

 Luis Angel Arango Library - Pumarejo bridge

Bridges in Colombia
Bridges completed in 1974
Buildings and structures in Atlántico Department